The 498th Fighter-Interceptor Squadron is an inactive United States Air Force unit. Its last assignment was with Air Defense Command stationed at Hamilton Air Force Base, California.   It was inactivated on 30 September 1968.

History

World War II
it was established in early 1942 as a III Fighter Command Operational Training Unit (OTU), and equipped with a mixture of second-line single engine training aircraft. The squadron upgraded in 1943 with P-47 Thunderbolts for Replacement Crew Training (RTU).  It was inactivated in April 1944.

Air Defense of the Pacific Northwest
The squadron was reactivated in August 1955 as a United States Air Force Air Defense Command interceptor squadron, and assigned to Geiger Field, Washington.  Its mission was to provide air defense for the Pacific Northwest.  It was equipped with F-86D Sabres, and then upgraded to F-102s in 1957 and then to F-106s in 1959. It was the first operational squadron to receive the Delta Dart.

On 22 October 1962, before President John F. Kennedy told Americans that missiles were in place in Cuba, the squadron dispersed one third of its force, equipped with nuclear tipped missiles to Paine Air Force Base at the start of the Cuban Missile Crisis. These planes returned to McChord after the crisis.

On 15 March 1963 two Soviet bombers overflew Alaska and Alaskan Air Command F-102s were unable to intercept them. The response to this intrusion was to deploy ten F-106s from the squadron and its sister unit, the 318th Fighter-Interceptor Squadron to Alaska in what was called Operation White Shoes. However, maintaining these aircraft for an extended period of time put a strain on the 325th wing's combat readiness back at McChord, and eventually a detachment of maintenance personnel was established to maintain the planes in Alaska.  The unit got relief from this commitment while it was upgrading its F-106s from the 1st Fighter Wing, which relieved it from March to June 1964.  Operation White Shoes terminated in 1965 and the unit's planes returned home.

It moved to McChord AFB in 1963, and to Paine Field in 1966.

It moved to Hamilton AFB, California in 1968 and was inactivated the same day. Its aircraft were reassigned to the 84th Fighter-Interceptor Squadron.

Lineage
 Constituted 303d Bombardment Squadron (Light) on 13 January 1942.
 Activated on 10 February 1942
 Redesignated: 303d Bombardment Squadron (Dive) on 27 July 1942
 Redesignated: 498th Fighter-Bomber Squadron on 10 August 1943.
 Disbanded on 1 April 1944
 Reconstituted, and redesignated 498th Fighter-Interceptor Squadron, on 20 June 1955.
 Activated on 18 August 1955.
 Inactivated on 30 September 1968.

Assignments
 84th Bombardment (later Fighter-Bomber) Group, 10 February 1942 – 1 April 1944
 84th Fighter Group (Air Defense), 18 August 1955
 325th Fighter Wing (Air Defense), 1 July 1963
 57th Fighter Group (Air Defense), 25 January 1966
 78th Fighter Group, 30 September 1968

Stations
 Hunter Field, Georgia, 10 February 1942
 Drew Field, Florida, 8 February 1943
 Harding Field, Louisiana, 4 October 1943
 Hammond Army Air Field, Louisiana, c. 11 October 1943
 Abilene Army Air Field, Texas, 11 February – April 1944
 Geiger Field, Washington, 18 August 1955
 McChord Air Force Base, Washington, 1 July 1963
 Paine Field, Washington, 14 June 1966
 Hamilton Air Force Base California, 30 September 1968

Aircraft
 V-72 Vengeance, 1942
 A-24 Banshee, 1942–1943
 P-39 Airacobra, 1943
 P-47 Thunderbolt, 1943–1944
 F-86D Sabre Interceptor, 1955–1957
 F-102A Delta Dagger, 1957–1959
 F-106A Delta Dart, 1959–1968

See also

References

Bibliography

 
 
 McMullen, Richard F. (1964) "The Fighter Interceptor Force 1962–1964"  ADC Historical Study No. 27, Air Defense Command, Ent Air Force Base, CO (Confidential, declassified 22 March 2000)
 NORAD/CONAD Participation in the Cuban Missile Crisis, Historical Reference Paper No. 8, Directorate of Command History Continental Air Defense Command, Ent AFB, CO , 1 Feb 63 (Top Secret NOFORN declassified 9 March 1996)
 "ADCOM's Fighter Interceptor Squadrons". The Interceptor (January 1979) Aerospace Defense Command, (Volume 21, Number 1)

External links

Fighter squadrons of the United States Air Force
Military units and formations established in 1955
1955 establishments in the United States